La Disperata was the name given to the group of bodyguards who protected Gabriele D'Annunzio. It was taken up in turn by a number of later squadre and fascist military units in Italy between 1921 and 1945.

At Fiume 
The origins of the name go back to the Fiume expedition of 1919. The writer Gabriele D'Annunzio seized control of the city, planning to unify it with the Kingdom of Italy, and creating the short-lived  Italian Regency of Carnaro. Guido Keller formed a military corps from volunteers who has made their way to Fiume from Italy and had camped out in the city's shipyards. Keller experimented with his ideas of a new military order, making them march bare-chested and singing through the streets of the city. In the evenings they gathered at a restaurant called “La Torretta”, where they started hand grenade fights. This corps took the name La Disperata meaning “(the guard) of desperate men”, and became famous among the arditi and fascists for their fearlessness and the charisma of its leaders.

Squadre 
The first squadra to take the name was formed in Florence on 14 March 1921. It had twenty-one members.

The name was then taken up by squadre in other cities including Bari, Brescia, Caltanissetta, Cosenza, Genoa, Gorizia, Livorno, Lodi, Modena, Padua, Parma, Portici, Turin, Treviso and Venice. Foligno and Perugia adopted the variant La Disperatissima (“the most desperate”).

Air force squadrons 

The name La Disperata was adopted by the 83rd Squadron and the  15th Caproni Bomber Squadron of the Regia Aeronautica. The Caproni squadron took part in the Second Italo-Ethiopian War (1935-1936) under the command of Galeazzo Ciano.

References

Further reading 
 Paolo Ferrari (2004). L'aeronautica italiana: una storia del Novecento. FrancoAngeli. .
 Mimmo Franzinelli (2004). Squadristi. Protagonisti e tecniche della violenza fascista, 1919–1922. Mondadori. 
 Manlio Cancogni (1980). Gli Squadristi. Longanesi.
 Alessandro Pavolini (1937) Disperata. Vallechi

Gabriele D'Annunzio
Italian Fascism
Modern history of Italy
20th century in Italy
Kingdom of Italy (1861–1946)